L'Hôte may refer to:
 Jean L'Hôte (1929–1985), French screenwriter and film director
 the original French title of The Guest, short story by Albert Camus from 1957